Nicholas Aaron Young (born June 1, 1985), nicknamed "Swaggy P", is an American former professional basketball player. He played college basketball for the USC Trojans and was a two-time first-team all-conference selection in the Pac-10. Young was selected by the Washington Wizards in the first round of the 2007 NBA draft with the 16th overall pick. He won an NBA championship with the Golden State Warriors in 2018.

High school career
Born in Los Angeles, California, Young played for Hamilton High School, Dorsey High School, and Cleveland High School in suburban Reseda, California. He averaged 27.2 points and 10.8 rebounds as a 2004 senior at Cleveland, earning 2004 CIF L.A. City Section, Los Angeles Times All-City and San Fernando Valley first team honors. He shot 57.3% from the field and 46.8% from three-point range (52-of-111), had 48 steals and 41 blocks as Cleveland finished 25–4. Young was tabbed the seventh-best player in the country by HoopScoop and listed by prep basketball guru Frank Burlison as among the Top 50 recruits in 2004. He once scored 56 points in one game and had 23 rebounds in another. He earned CIF L.A. City Section first team honors in 2003 and was included in a list of Top Seniors by Athlon Sports heading into 2004.

College career
Young played for the University of Southern California from 2004 to 2007 and was All-Pac-10 First Team in the 2005–06 and 2006–07 seasons. In the 2007 NCAA Tournament, Young led the fifth-seeded Trojans to a berth in the Sweet Sixteen, where they lost to the one-seeded North Carolina Tar Heels, 74–64. Along the way, Young led USC to a 77–60 first-round win against Arkansas. In the 2nd round, Young led the team with 22 points over the Texas Longhorns in an 87–68 rout of the team featuring the National Player of the Year, Kevin Durant, though Durant led both teams in scoring with 30.

As expected, following his junior season, Young announced on April 15, 2007, to the Los Angeles Times that he would forgo his senior year to turn professional and enter the 2007 NBA Draft, where he was selected with the 16th overall pick by the Washington Wizards.

Professional career

Washington Wizards (2007–2012)
Young was selected 16th overall by the Washington Wizards in the 2007 NBA draft. He started his first career NBA game on December 15, 2007, against the Sacramento Kings.

On January 9, 2010, Young was fined $10,000 by the Washington Wizards for participating in antics before a game on January 5, 2010, against the Philadelphia 76ers. Gilbert Arenas was being investigated for a prior incident involving guns in the Wizards' locker room, but made light of the accusations by pointing his finger at his teammates, as if he were shooting them. His teammates were photographed smiling and laughing with him.

Young scored a career-high 43 points on January 11, 2011, against the Sacramento Kings.

Los Angeles Clippers (2012)
On March 15, 2012, Young was traded to the Los Angeles Clippers in a three-way trade involving the Denver Nuggets and Washington Wizards. Later, on April 16, 2012, he helped the Clippers clinch their first playoff berth in 6 years with a 19-point performance against the Oklahoma City Thunder. He was also a key part of the Clippers' comeback victory against the Memphis Grizzlies in game one of the first round of the 2012 playoffs, making three three-pointers in under a minute.

Philadelphia 76ers (2012–2013)
On July 12, 2012, Young signed with the Philadelphia 76ers to a one-year deal.

Los Angeles Lakers (2013–2017)
On July 11, 2013, Young signed with the Los Angeles Lakers. During the 2013–14 season, he converted a Lakers-record seven four-point plays while averaging a career-high 17.9 points per game.

On July 21, 2014, Young re-signed with Lakers to a reported four-year, $21.5 million contract. During training camp, he suffered a complete tear of the radial collateral ligament in his right thumb, and was expected to miss six to eight weeks. After missing the first ten games of the season with the injury, Young made his season debut on November 18 against the Atlanta Hawks, recording 17 points and 5 rebounds in a 114–109 win. On December 12, he scored a season-high 29 points in a 112–110 win over the San Antonio Spurs.

On November 30, 2016, Young was ruled out for two to four weeks due to a strained right calf muscle. On December 17, 2016, he made eight three-pointers and scored a season-high 32 points in a 119–108 loss to the Cleveland Cavaliers. Between late December and early January, Young's burst from long range gave him 36 three-pointers in eight games—the most in an eight-game stretch in Lakers franchise history. On April 2, 2017, after being held out of 11 of the previous 12 games despite being healthy, Young was shut down by the Lakers for the last five regular-season games. On June 21, 2017, the Lakers announced that Young elected not to exercise his option to extend his contract for the 2017–18 season, thus becoming an unrestricted free agent.

Golden State Warriors (2017–2018)
On July 7, 2017, Young signed with the Golden State Warriors. In his debut for the Warriors in their season opener on October 17, 2017, Young came off the bench to hit six 3-pointers and score 23 points in a 122–121 loss to the Houston Rockets. He helped the Warriors reach the 2018 NBA Finals, where they defeated the Cleveland Cavaliers in a four-game sweep, with Young winning his first NBA championship.

Denver Nuggets (2018)
On December 10, 2018, Young signed with the Denver Nuggets. Twenty days later, on December 30, he was waived by the Nuggets, after appearing in only four games.

On April 18, 2021, Young signed with the Enemies of the Big3.

Career statistics

NBA

Regular season

|-
| style="text-align:left;"| 
| style="text-align:left;"| Washington
| 75 || 2 || 15.4 || .439 || .400 || .815 || 1.5 || .8 || .5 || .1 || 7.5
|-
| style="text-align:left;"| 
| style="text-align:left;"| Washington
| 82 || 5 || 22.4 || .444 || .341 || .850 || 1.8 || 1.2 || .5 || .2 || 10.9
|-
| style="text-align:left;"| 
| style="text-align:left;"| Washington
| 74 || 23 || 19.2 || .418 || .406 || .800 || 1.4 || .6 || .4 || .1 || 8.6
|-
| style="text-align:left;"| 
| style="text-align:left;"| Washington
| 64 || 40 || 31.8 || .441 || .387 || .816 || 2.7 || 1.2 || .7 || .3 || 17.4
|-
| style="text-align:left;"| 
| style="text-align:left;"| Washington
| 40 || 32 || 30.3 || .406 || .371 || .862 || 2.4 || 1.1 || .8 || .3 || 16.6
|-
| style="text-align:left;"| 
| style="text-align:left;"| L.A. Clippers
| 22 || 3 || 23.5 || .394 || .353 || .821 || 1.6 || .5 || .6 || .3 || 9.7
|-
| style="text-align:left;"| 
| style="text-align:left;"| Philadelphia
| 59 || 17 || 23.9 || .413 || .357 || .820 || 1.8 || 1.4 || .6 || .2 || 10.6
|-
| style="text-align:left;"| 
| style="text-align:left;"| L.A. Lakers
| 64 || 9 || 28.3 || .435 || .386 || .825 || 2.6 || 1.5 || .7 || .2 || 17.9
|-
| style="text-align:left;"| 
| style="text-align:left;"| L.A. Lakers
| 42 || 0 || 23.8 || .366 || .369 || .892 || 2.3 || 1.0 || .5 || .3 || 13.4
|-
| style="text-align:left;"| 
| style="text-align:left;"| L.A. Lakers
| 54 || 2 || 19.1 || .339 || .325 || .829 || 1.8 || .6 || .4 || .1 || 7.3
|-
| style="text-align:left;"| 
| style="text-align:left;"| L.A. Lakers
| 60 || 60 || 25.9 || .430 || .404 || .856 || 2.3 || 1.0 || .6 || .2 || 13.2
|-
| style="text-align:left;background:#afe6ba;"| †
| style="text-align:left;"| Golden State
| 80 || 8 || 17.4 || .412 || .377 || .862 || 1.6 || .5 || .5 || .1 || 7.3
|-
| style="text-align:left;"| 
| style="text-align:left;"| Denver
| 4 || 0 || 9.3 || .333 || .375 || .000 || .3 || .5 || .0 || .3 || 2.3
|- class="sortbottom"
| style="text-align:center;" colspan="2"| Career
| 720 || 201 || 22.8 || .418 || .376 || .836 || 2.0 || 1.0 || .5 || .2 || 11.4

Playoffs

|-
| style="text-align:left;"| 2008
| style="text-align:left;"| Washington
| 4 || 0 || 4.3 || .111 || .000 || .750 || .5 || .3 || .5 || .0 || 1.3
|-
| style="text-align:left;"| 2012
| style="text-align:left;"| L.A. Clippers
| 11 || 0 || 18.2 || .433 || .515 || .889 || 1.1 || .3 || .3 || .4 || 8.3
|-
| style="text-align:left;background:#afe6ba;"| 2018†
| style="text-align:left;"| Golden State
| 20 || 2 || 10.3 || .302 || .298 || .750 || .6 || .2 || .1 || .0 || 2.6
|- class="sortbottom"
| style="text-align:center;" colspan="2"| Career
| 35 || 2 || 12.1 || .357 || .378 || .833 || .7 || .2 || .2 || .1 || 4.2

College

|-
| style="text-align:left;"| 2004–05
| style="text-align:left;"| USC
| 29 || 24 || 25.7 || .441 || .315 || .644 || 4.1 || 1.3 || .8 || .3 || 11.1
|-
| style="text-align:left;"| 2005–06
| style="text-align:left;"| USC
| 30 || 30 || 33.9 || .467 || .333 || .801 || 6.6 || 1.6 || 1.0 || .2 || 17.3
|-
| style="text-align:left;"| 2006–07
| style="text-align:left;"| USC
| 37 || 36 || 33.2 || .525 || .440 || .786 || 4.6 || 1.4 || .7 || .3 || 17.5
|- class="sortbottom"
| style="text-align:center;" colspan="2"| Career
| 96 || 90 || 31.1 || .483 || .368 || .764 || 5.1 || 1.4 || .8 || .3 || 15.5

Boxing career 
On September 10, 2022 Young made his boxing debut against TikTok star Malcom Minikon in an exhibition bout as the co-feature on the Austin McBroom vs. AnEsonGib at the Banc of California Stadium. The bout ended as a no contest after an accidental headbutt was performed by Minikon.

Personal life
In 2007, Young became the main subject of a documentary titled Second Chance Season, in which his exploits, shortcomings, and successes are reviewed. Young's nickname is "Swaggy P", which he said is a pseudo-biblical reference to "the Prophet of Swag".

Relationships and family 
Young is the cousin of Kevon Looney, who is an NBA player. They became teammates with the Warriors in 2017–18. Young is also a cousin of rappers Kendrick Lamar and Baby Keem.

Young has been in an on-again, off-again relationship with his high school sweetheart, Keonna Green, since 2002. They have three children together: two sons (born in 2012 and 2019) and a daughter (born in 2016). They became engaged in 2019.

Young and Australian rapper Iggy Azalea announced their engagement on June 1, 2015. Azalea broke off their engagement a year later after a video of Young discussing how he was having an affair with another woman surfaced. After Azalea broke off her engagement to Young, Green confirmed that she was 22 weeks pregnant with their daughter.

References

External links

 
 Nick Young at usctrojans.com

1985 births
Living people
African-American basketball players
American men's basketball players
Basketball players from Los Angeles
Big3 players
Denver Nuggets players
Golden State Warriors players
Los Angeles Clippers players
Los Angeles Lakers players
People from the San Fernando Valley
Philadelphia 76ers players
Shooting guards
Small forwards
USC Trojans men's basketball players
Washington Wizards draft picks
Washington Wizards players
21st-century African-American sportspeople
20th-century African-American people
American men's 3x3 basketball players